Sir George Clausen  (18 April 1852 – 22 November 1944) was a British artist working in oil and watercolour, etching, mezzotint, drypoint and occasionally lithographs. He was knighted in 1927.

Biography
George Clausen was born at 8 William Street in the Regents Park district of London on 18 April 1852, the son of a decorative artist of Danish descent and a Scottish mother. From 1867 to 1873, he attended the design classes at the South Kensington Schools in London with great success. He then worked in the studio of Edwin Long RA, and subsequently in Paris under Bouguereau and Tony Robert-Fleury at the Académie Julian. He was an admirer of the naturalism of the painter Jules Bastien-Lepage about whom he wrote in 1888 and 1892.

Clausen became one of the foremost modern painters of landscape and of peasant life, influenced to a certain extent by the Impressionists, with whom he shared the view that light is the real subject of landscape art. His pictures excel in rendering the appearance of things under flecking outdoor sunlight, or in the shady shelter of a barn or stable. His Girl at the Gate was acquired by the Chantrey Trustees and is now at the Tate Gallery.  The Yale Center for British Art holds Clausen's Schoolgirls (1880), an urban scene, which it featured in its exhibit called "Britain in the World: 1860-Now."

Other landscapes included "The Fields in June" (1914) and "Midsummer Dawn" (1921). For the Imperial War Museum he painted the large, broadly decorative, "Gun Factory at Woolwich Arsenal" (1919). His decorative work also included "Renaissance" (1915) and decorations for the Hall at High Royd, Huddersfield, consisting of life-size figures in lunettes.

Clausen was a founding member of the New English Art Club in 1886. In 1895, he was elected an Associate of the Royal Academy, and a full Academician in 1906. He was elected as the Master of the Art Workers' Guild in 1909. As Professor of Painting at the Royal Academy he gave a memorable series of lectures to the students of the Schools, published as Six Lectures on Painting (1904) and Aims and Ideals in Art (1906).

Clausen was an official war artist during World War I. During the war his daughter's fiancé was killed; this event may have inspired his painting, Youth Mourning which shows a distressed young woman mourning in a desolate landscape. Clausen also contributed six lithographs on the theme Making Guns for the Government published print portfolio Britain's Efforts and Ideals.

In 1921 Clausen was an original member of the Society of Graphic Art and showed his work in their first exhibition.

He died at home in the village of Cold Ash in 1944 and was buried there next to his wife in the parish churchyard.

References

Attribution:

Sources
 Gibson, Frank. The Etchings and Lithographs of George Clausen, R.A. The Print Collector's Quarterly 1921 July Vol 8, No. 2, pp 203, 212.
 Gibson, Frank. Notes to Catalogue of Etchings by George Clausen The Print Collector's Quarterly 1921 Dec Vol 8, No. 4, p 433.
 Rutherson, Albert (editor). Contemporary British Artists: George Clausen Publisher: Ernest Benn Ltd, 1923
 Sir George Clausen, R.A. 1852–1944; Bradford Art Gallery, 1980. Catalogue of an exhibition held in Bradford, London, Bristol and Newcastle upon Tyne in 1980.

External links

 
  Works by Clausen in the Imperial War Museum collection

1852 births
1944 deaths
19th-century English painters
English male painters
20th-century English painters
British landscape painters
British war artists
Painters from London
Royal Academicians
Académie Julian alumni
World War I artists
Masters of the Art Worker's Guild
20th-century English male artists
19th-century English male artists